The Marble Collegiate Church, founded in 1628, is one of the oldest continuous Protestant congregations in North America. The congregation, which is part of two denominations in the Reformed tradition—the United Church of Christ and the Reformed Church in America—is now located at 272 Fifth Avenue at the corner of West 29th Street in the NoMad neighborhood of Manhattan, New York City. It was built in 1851–54 and was designed by Samuel A. Warner in Romanesque Revival style with Gothic trim. The façade is covered in Tuckahoe marble, for which the church, originally called the Fifth Avenue Church, was renamed in 1906.

The building was designated a New York City landmark in 1967, and was added to the National Register of Historic Places in 1980.

History

 
The church congregation was founded in 1628 as the Collegiate Reformed Protestant Dutch Church and was affiliated with the Dutch Reformed Church, a Calvinist church in the Netherlands. During its first 150 years, Marble shared its ministers with the other Collegiate congregations as they developed in the city. This pooling of pastoral ministry was abandoned in 1871. The name "Collegiate" remains as part of the heritage of the four such churches in New York City today, and they participate in an administrative unit that oversees physical properties and investments held in common. The other congregations are Middle Collegiate, West End Collegiate, and Fort Washington Collegiate.

Norman Vincent Peale, the noted author of The Power of Positive Thinking, served as senior minister from 1932 to 1984. Under Peale's ministry Marble's influence reached national levels and it became known as "America's Hometown Church". On November 19, 1961, Lucille Ball married her second husband Gary Morton in the church. Following Peale's fifty-two year ministry, Arthur Caliandro served 25 years as the fifth senior minister of Marble Church. In all, he served 42 years on the pastoral staff. During Caliandro's tenure, MarbleVision, the media ministry of Marble Church, was founded, its first woman minister was ordained, and the first women elders received. In addition, the church added its first new stained-glass window in almost 100 years. In 2009, Michael B. Brown, former pastor of Centenary United Methodist Church in Winston-Salem, North Carolina, succeeded Caliandro as senior minister.

Peale was the reason why the Trump family came to attend Marble Collegiate Church; Peale also officiated the first marriage of Donald to Ivana Trump in 1977. In 1993, Marble's Minister Arthur Caliandro performed Trump's marriage to Marla Maples in the Grand Ballroom of the Plaza Hotel owned at the time by Trump. During his 2015–16 run for the Republican Party's presidential nomination, Donald Trump claimed to attend Marble Collegiate Church. Marble stated that though he has a history with the church, Trump is not currently an active member of Marble's congregation.

The church takes an LGBT-welcoming, open and affirming approach to  same-gender relationships and non-cisgender identities. This includes the performing of same-sex marriage ceremonies, a designated queer fellowship (GIFTS), annual participation in the NYC Pride parade  and sermons and material on the church website encouraging a historical-critical view of Scripture in opposition to the conservative belief in Biblical Inerrancy.

Pastors of the Marble Collegiate Church
Daniel A. Poling, 1922-1939
Norman Vincent Peale, 1932-1984
Arthur Caliandro

See also
Oldest churches in the United States

References

External links 

 

Properties of religious function on the National Register of Historic Places in Manhattan
Churches completed in 1854
19th-century Reformed Church in America church buildings
Churches in Manhattan
Reformed Church in America churches
Religious organizations established in 1628
Former Dutch Reformed churches in New York (state)
Midtown Manhattan
1628 establishments in the Dutch Empire
New York City Designated Landmarks in Manhattan
Romanesque Revival church buildings in New York City